Ben McLachlan and Yasutaka Uchiyama were the defending champions but only Uchiyama chose to defend his title, partnering Kaito Uesugi. Uchiyama withdrew before his semifinal match.

Gonçalo Oliveira and Akira Santillan won the title after defeating Li Zhe and Go Soeda 2–6, 6–4, [12–10] in the final.

Seeds

Draw

References
 Main Draw

Kobe Challenger - Doubles
2018 Doubles